Moskovo (Mäśkäw) is a rural locality (a village) in Nauruzovsky Selsoviet, Uchalinsky District, Bashkortostan, Russia. The population was 409 as of 2010. There are 4 streets.

Geography 
Moskovo is located 60 km southwest of Uchaly (the district's administrative centre) by road. Mishkino is the nearest rural locality.

References 

Rural localities in Uchalinsky District